Genoplesium acuminatum, commonly known as the pointed midge orchid and as Corunastylis acuminata in Australia, is a small terrestrial orchid endemic to eastern Australia. It has a single thin leaf fused to the flowering stem and up to sixteen small, hairy, greenish purple to brownish purple flowers. It is found in coastal and near-coastal parts of New South Wales and Queensland.

Description
There is an oblong callus in the centre of the labellum and extending about half way to its tip. Flowering occurs between December and May.

Taxonomy and naming
The pointed midge orchid was first formally described in 1927 by Richard Sanders Rogers who gave it the name Prasophyllum acuminatum and published the description in Transactions and Proceedings of the Royal Society of South Australia. In 1989, David Jones and Mark Clements changed the name to Genoplesium acuminatum and in 1998 changed the name again to Corunastylis acuminata. The specific epithet (acuminatum) is a Latin word meaning "sharpened" or "pointed".

Distribution and habitat
Genoplesium acuminatum grows in forest in coastal and near-coastal areas of New South Wales from near Sydney north to Fraser Island in Queensland.

References

External links
 

acuminatum
Endemic orchids of Australia
Orchids of New South Wales
Orchids of Queensland
Plants described in 1927